Svein Bakke (23 June 1953 – 16 December 2015) was a Norwegian footballer who played for Sogndal Fotball from 1971 to 1990. Bakke was central player when Sogndal faced SK Brann in  the 1976 Norwegian Football Cup. Bakke played 514 matches over his nineteen-year career and scored 321 goals (in all competitions, including friendlies).

Bakke served Sogndal in an administrative position until 2005, aside from one year (1999) with Wimbledon F.C. in England. Bakke later worked in the private sector.

Svein Bakke was the father of former Leeds United and Norway midfielder Eirik Bakke, who is currently Sogndal's manager.

References

1953 births
2015 deaths
Sogndal Fotball players
Norwegian footballers
Association football forwards
Wimbledon F.C. non-playing staff
Norwegian expatriate sportspeople in England